Charles Secretan (January 19, 1815 – January 21, 1895) was a Swiss philosopher. He was born on 19 January 1815 in Lausanne, Switzerland, where he also died on 21 January 1895.

Educated in his native town and later under Friedrich Schelling in Munich, he became a professor of philosophy at Lausanne (1838 to 1846), and later at Neuchâtel.  In 1866 he returned to his old position at Lausanne.

In 1837 he founded, and for a time edited the Revue Suisse. The object of his writing was to build up a rational, philosophical religion to reconcile the ultimate bases of Christianity with the principles of metaphysical philosophy.

Works 
La Philosophie de la liberté (1848)
La Raison et le Christianisme (1863)
La Civilisation et les croyances (1887)
Les Droits de l'Humanité (1890)
Mon Utopie (1892)
Preface to Le problème de l'immortalité by Emmanuel Pétavel-Olliff (1892)

References

Attribution:
 This work in turn cites:
François T. Pillon, La Philosophie de Charles Secrétan (Paris 1898; reprinted 2006)

External links
 
 

1815 births
1895 deaths
Swiss philosophers
Swiss Protestants